Song Yuqi (born September 23, 1999), known mononymously as Yuqi, is a Chinese singer, songwriter, record producer and dancer. She is active as a soloist in China and is a part of the South Korean girl group (G)I-dle, which debuted in 2018. She was one of the cast members for the Chinese variety show Keep Running in 2019 and 2021, and the host on KakaoTV reality show Learn Way (2020–2021).

Early life 
Song Yuqi was born on September 23, 1999, in Beijing, China. She attended Beijing 101 Middle School.

Career

Pre-debut
In 2015, Song attended the Cube Star World Audition Beijing Station, performing CLC's "High Heels" and G.E.M.'s "Bubble". She passed her audition and became a trainee of Cube Entertainment.

In June 2017, she participated in a promotional video for Rising Star Cosmetics.

In February 2018, she played a girl singing in the street to people in a video Dingo drama "What if an idol trainee asks you to listen to a song? It's a reversal of voice, I wish I could debut | world temperature" (아이돌 연습생이 노래를 들어 달라고 한다면? 반전 목소리네 꼭 데뷔했으면 좋겠다 | 세상의 온도)

2018–2020: (G)I-dle and solo activities

On April 8, 2018, Yuqi was revealed to be an upcoming member of Cube Entertainment's new girl group, (G)I-dle. She debuted with the group on May 2, 2018, with the lead single titled "Latata" of their debut album, I Am.

In 2019, Song became a cast member for the seventh season of the Chinese TV show Keep Running.

In April 2019 Song was cast in a new variety show The Gashinas. The pilot episode aired on May 19. In June 2019, Song was confirmed as part of the cast for Law of the Jungle in Myanmar. In September, Song sang in a social travel reality show Please Pay Attention Visitors ending song, "Happy Seasoning".

In May 2020, Song debuted as a co songwriter and composer with "I'm the Trend". "I'm the Trend" is a song dedicated to (G)-Idle's fandom, Neverland, and was unveiled during her group's first online concert I-Land: Who Am I, on July 5, 2020. On May 29, Song was cast as the first performer alongside WJSN's Exy and Yeoreum in 1theK Originals' The First Date. The show aim to build new friendship by sharing various games, missions, and quizzes by girl group members who have met frequently on various music broadcasts, but have not had the opportunity to get close to each other. For (G)I-dle's first single album, Song was credited for "Dumdi Dumdi" Chinese lyrics and guide alongside Z King. On September 17, KakaoTV launched an original entertainment Learn Way, a program that captures the process of being reborn as an 'all-rounder' by meeting with expert mentors in various fields with Song as the host. The show was aired on September 20. In October, Song was cast in tvN's I'm a Survivor which features Park Eun-ha as the instructor and 6 entertainers who'll go through a survival training project. On November 9, it was announced that Song would participate in G-Star 2020 with Krafton, an e-sports reality show where celebrities and streamers entered a special school that specialized in battlegrounds conduct episodes and talk related to PlayerUnknown's Battlegrounds Series 3. On November 22, Song appeared on Play Seoul, a program produced by the Seoul Tourism Foundation and KBS where influential K-stars can share with global fans their experiences in Seoul in real-time. The show aims to promote safe post-COVID-19 tourism in Seoul. Song introduced the hip alley ways in Seoul by visiting Euljiro and Itaewon for their cafes and restaurants. On November 30, Song will also appear in Seoul Connects U, a variety travel show jointly planned and produced by MBC and Seoul Tourism Foundation. The program will show a time slip trip in the same space and at different times to global fans by linking the past and present of Seoul through photos of stars and fans in real-time.

2021: Solo debut
On May 6, 2021, Cube Entertainment announced that Song would debut as a solo artist with single album "A Page" on May 13, which includes the lead singles "Giant" and "Bonnie & Clyde". On October 27, Song participated in the Beijing 2022 Winter Olympics and Paralympic Games theme song "Salute to the Heroes".

Personal life
Song came to South Korea in 2016 and is known to have high-level Korean proficiency. Her Korean Proficiency level was certified in 2020 when she gained Level 5 out of 6 overall in the TOPIK test (222, 8 points below the level 6 score of 230). When asked about her language skills in KBS2's Happy Together 3, she answered, "Kim Soo-hyun was my Korean teacher. I fell in love with him after watching the drama My Love from the Star. I studied Korean with my mother with the drama."

In addition to Korean and her native Mandarin Chinese, Song is also fluent in English.

In the media
After appearing on various South Korean entertainment shows such as KBS2 Happy Together 3, JTBC Knowing Bros, MBC Every 1 Korean Foreigners, and SBS Running Man. She has also acted as a special MC on SBS MTV's The Show and hosted her own show KakaoTV's Learn Way. Despite being a foreigner, Song was praised for her sense of entertainment and her fluent Korean speaking ability in commanding of sentences and vocabulary and the use of words that only the Koreans know. Korean media has cited her "Yoo Jae-seok-class sense of entertainment" and calling her "outstanding Korean skills that are different from those from other idol groups".

Other ventures

Ambassadorship
In 2021, Song was appointed as the ambassador for the International Day of the Deaf, jointly organized by Baidu and Listening Foundation.

Endorsements
On April 28, 2019, Song was introduced as Vivlas new beauty brand model.

In 2021, Song become one of the most in-demand endorsers among young consumers for her outstanding performance skills. In June, Song endorsed Momenten, a sugar-free sparkling alcohol brand, and Limeflare, a fashion and jewelry brand. On August 6, she was chosen to become the face of luxury sunglasses and eyeglasses Ray-Ban in Greater China due to her "brave[ness] in expressing her true self and full of positive energy."

Discography

Single albums

Singles

Music videos

Composition credits
All song credits are adapted from the Korea Music Copyright Association's database, unless otherwise noted.

Filmography

Television shows

Web shows

References

External links

 Song Yuqi on Sina Weibo
 

1999 births
Living people
Singers from Beijing
(G)I-dle members
Cube Entertainment artists
K-pop singers
Song Yuqi
Chinese K-pop singers
Chinese expatriates in South Korea
Chinese mezzo-sopranos
Chinese composers
Chinese women composers
Chinese women singer-songwriters
English-language singers from South Korea
English-language singers from China
Japanese-language singers of South Korea
Japanese-language singers of China
Korean-language singers of China
Mandarin-language singers of South Korea
South Korean songwriters
South Korean composers
21st-century Chinese women singers